The fourth season of Dancing on Ice began airing on 6 January 2019  and ended on 10 February 2019 on Sat.1.

The series will once again be filmed in the Magic Media Company Coloneum at Ossendorf in Köln, which was set up for the first series.

Daniel Boschmann and Marlene Lufen are the hosts, replacing Oliver Petzokat and Katarina Witt.

Daniel Weiss is returning for his third series as a judge, with the new judges Katarina Witt, Judith Williams and Cale Kalay, replacing Kati Winkler and Reinhold Mirmseker.

The competition was won by Sarah Lombardi with professional partner Joti Polizoakis.

Couples

Scoring chart

 indicates the couple eliminated that week
 indicates the couple were in the skate-off but not eliminated
 indicates the couple was eliminated but later returned to the competition.
 indicates the couple withdrew from the competition
 indicates the winning couple
 indicates the runner-up couple
 indicates the third-place couple
 indicate the highest score for that week
 indicate the lowest score for that week
"—" indicates the couple(s) that did not skate that week

Average chart
This table only counts for dances scored on a traditional 40-point scale.

Live show details

Week 1 (6 January)
 Group performance: Holiday on Ice

Save Me skates
 Sarina & David: "(You Make Me Feel Like) A Natural Woman"—Aretha Franklin
 Désirée & Alexander: "Sign of the Times"—Harry Styles
Judges' voted to save
Sarina & David

Week 2 (13 January)
 Group performance: "Came Here for Love"—Sigala & Ella Eyre (performed by Holiday on Ice & Contestant)

Save Me skates
 Aleksandra & Matti: "Chasing Cars"—Snow Patrol
 Kevin & Myriam: "Too Good at Goodbyes"—Sam Smith
Judges' voted to save
Kevin & Myriam

Week 3 (20 January)
 Group performance: "I Wanna Dance with Somebody"—Whitney Houston (performed by Holiday on Ice & Contestant)
Due to an injury, Sarah & Joti will not compete in the live show. Aleksandra & Matti returned to the competition.

Save Me skates
 Sarina & David: "(You Make Me Feel Like) A Natural Woman"—Aretha Franklin
 Kevin & Myriam: "Too Good at Goodbyes"—Sam Smith
Judges' voted to save
Sarina & David

Week 4 (27 January)
 Group performance: "This Is Me"—Keala Settle (performed by Contestant)

Save Me skates
 Aleksandra & Matti: "Chasing Cars"—Snow Patrol
 Detlef & Kat: "Don't Stop 'Til You Get Enough"—Michael Jackson
Judges' voted to save
Aleksandra & Matti

Week 5: Semi-final (3 February)
 Group performance: Aljona Savchenko & Bruno Massot
Timur Bartels had to withdraw from the show because of family issue.

Save Me skates
 Aleksandra & Matti: "Happy"—Pharrell Williams
 Sarina & David:"Havana"—Camila Cabello & Young Thug
Judges' voted to save
Sarina & David

Week 6: Final (10 February)
 Group performance: "I'm a Survivor"—Reba McEntire (performed by Wesley Campbell & Finalists) / "Sax"—Fleur East (performed by Holiday on Ice & Finalists)

References

External links
Official website

2019 German television seasons
Germany series 4